Przylep  is a district of the city of Zielona Góra, in western Poland, located in the northwestern part of the city. It was a separate village until 2014.

During World War II the Germans established and operated a subcamp of the Gross-Rosen concentration camp in the village, whose prisoners were Jews.

References

Neighbourhoods in Poland
Zielona Góra